Jules Bigot (22 October 1915, Bully-les-Mines, Pas-de-Calais – 24 October 2007) was a French football player and manager. He played club football most notably with Lille; he was then manager in France and Belgium.

References

External links
Profile on French federation official site
Profile
[http://www.om1899.com/joueurs.php?id=137 Profile]

1915 births
2007 deaths
People from Bully-les-Mines
Sportspeople from Pas-de-Calais
French footballers
Footballers from Hauts-de-France
Association football midfielders
Association football forwards
France international footballers
Ligue 1 players
Olympique Lillois players
Olympique de Marseille players
AS Saint-Étienne players
Lille OSC players
Le Havre AC players
French football managers
Le Havre AC managers
FC Rouen managers
RC Lens managers
Cercle Brugge K.S.V. managers
Lille OSC managers
K.A.A. Gent managers
Royal Excel Mouscron managers
French expatriate football managers
French expatriate sportspeople in Belgium
Expatriate football managers in Belgium